Geerat J. Vermeij is a Dutch-born paleoecologist and evolutionary biologist in the Department of Earth and Planetary Sciences at the University of California, Davis. He studies marine molluscs both as fossils and as living creatures. He received a MacArthur Fellowship in 1992,  and in 2000 was awarded the Daniel Giraud Elliot Medal from the National Academy of Sciences.

Early life and education
Vermeij was born 28 September 1946 in Sappemeer, Netherlands. Blind from the age of three, he studied Braille at the Prins Alexander Stichting Boarding School in Huis Ter Heide. He moved from The Netherlands to Nutley, New Jersey at age ten, and graduated from Nutley High School in 1965. Since the age of ten, Vermeij wanted to be a conchologist.

Vermeij graduated from Princeton University in 1968 and received his Ph.D. in biology and geology from Yale University in 1971.

Career
Vermeij studies coevolutionary relationships between predator and prey organisms, with a focus on marine mollusks. His research argues that an important evolutionary mechanism is the process of escalation, which occurs when species adapt to, or are limited by, their competitors, predators, and parasites.

In lieu of sight, Vermeij uses the sense of touch to better understand mollusk morphology. Throughout his career, he has challenged the assumption that people with disabilities like blindness cannot conduct scientific research.

Bibliography
 Evolution and Escalation: An Ecological History of Life
 A Natural History of Shells
 Privileged Hands: A Scientific Life
 Nature: An Economic History
 The Evolutionary World: How Adaptation Explains Everything from Seashells to Civilization.

References

External links
 Vermeij faculty page at UCD

1946 births
Living people
Scientists with disabilities
American malacologists
Dutch malacologists
Nutley High School alumni
People from Nutley, New Jersey
Paleobiologists
American blind people
MacArthur Fellows
Princeton University alumni
Yale University alumni
Dutch emigrants to the United States
University of California, Davis faculty
People from Hoogezand-Sappemeer
Blind academics